Imagination's Light is the seventh studio album (ninth album overall) from American new-age pianist Kevin Kern. As with his preceding albums, it is an album of instrumental songs, this time with one song being a cover version of a song by Sting. It was released on July 19, 2005.

This album reveals Kern's technique of making songs ever since he was a child: sitting by the piano in a darkened room and letting the light of imagination guide him. The liner notes mention that he does this until now.

Before creating this album, Kern was invited to become a Steinway Artist, and as such played a Steinway piano for Imagination's Light.

Dedication
In the accompanying booklet, Kevin Kern mentions basing "Keepers of the Flame" on an ancient Gregorian chant called "Pange Lingua". It is dedicated to Pope John Paul II.

Track listing
All tracks by Kevin Kern except track 5, written by Sting.

"Remembering the Light" – 4:23
"Safe in Your Embrace" – 3:44
"Pearls of Joy" – 3:52
"Told to the Heart" – 4:14
"Fields of Gold" – 4:50
"Imagination's Key" – 4:11
"Keepers of the Flame" – 3:47
"Musings" – 3:41
"Sweet Dreams, Helena" – 3:48
"I Am Always Right Here" – 3:31
"And the Light is Forever" – 3:21

Liner Notes
As a child, Kevin would sit in a room lit only by firelight, allowing his imagination to bring the images and emotions that he then combined with his immense talent into musical expression. To this day Kevin darkens the studio lights to compose his uniquely exquisite piano music, accompanied only by imagination's light.

Personnel
 Kevin Kern – Steinway Piano, Keyboards, Producer
 Terry Miller – Acoustic and electric bass guitar
 Mike Miller – Acoustic guitar
 Terence Yallop – Executive Producer

References

External links
Kevin Kern's official website
Kevin Kern at Real Music

Imagination's Light
Kevin Kern albums